Dorcatomini is a tribe of beetles in the family Ptinidae. There are at least 3 genera and 50 described species in Dorcatomini.

Genera
These 11 genera belong to the tribe Dorcatomini:
 Anitys Thomson, 1863 g
 ByrrhodesLeConte, Sakai, 1987 g
 CaenocaraThomson, Broun, 1893
 Caenotylistus Español, 1977
 Cyphanobium Scott, 1924
 Dimorphotheca Hayashi, 1955 g
 DorcatomaHerbst, Ford, 1970
 Metadorcatoma Español, 1977
 Mizodorcatoma 1878
 Mysticephala 1859
 Neobyrrhodes 1792
Data sources: i = ITIS, c = Catalogue of Life, g = GBIF, b = Bugguide.net

References

Further reading

External links

 

Ptinidae